Romana is a surname and female given name. 

Its roots are either from the Assyrian/Syriac Roma ('above') and na ('one'), or from the feminine form of the Latin name Romanus ('Roman').

Name days 
Czech: 18 November
Slovak: 23 February
Polish: 23 February
German: 23 February or 9 August
Hungarian: 23 February or 22 May

People with the given name
Romana Acosta Bañuelos (born 1925), Mexican American businesswoman and politician
Romana Bashir, Pakistani activist
Romana Calligaris (1924–2002), Italian freestyle swimmer
Romana Carén (born 1979), Austrian actress and director
Romana Chrenková (born 1987), Czech handball player
Romana D'Annunzio (born 1972), Scottish television presenter
Romana Didulo, Canadian false pretender and conspiracy theorist
Romana Dubnová (born 1978), Czech high jumper
Romana Graham (born 1986), New Zealand rugby union footballer
Romana Hamzová (born 1970), Czech basketball player
Romana Hejdová (born 1988), Czech basketball player
Romana Jalil, Pakistani politician
Romana Javitz (1903–1980), American artist and librarian
Romana Jerković (born 1964), Croatian politician
Romana Jordan Cizelj (born 1966), Slovene politician
Romana Kryzanowska (1923–2013), American Pilates student
Romana Maláčová (born 1987), Czech athlete
Romana Labounková (born 1989), Czech racing cyclist
Romana Tabak (born 1991), Slovak tennis player
Romana Tedjakusuma (born 1976), Indonesian tennis player
Romana Župan (born 1987), Croatian sports sailor

People with the surname
 Dimples Romana (born 1984), Filipina actress and model

Fictional characters
Romana (Doctor Who), a character from the British SF series Doctor Who

See also
Romana (disambiguation)
Romanus (disambiguation)
Romaña, a Spanish-language surname

References 
 Miloslava Knappová's Book

External links 
Romana - Behind the Name

Italian feminine given names
Czech feminine given names
Slovak feminine given names
Polish feminine given names
Slovene feminine given names
Croatian feminine given names
Urdu feminine given names